The UConn Huskies women's ice hockey program represented the University of Connecticut Huskies during the 2016–17 NCAA Division I women's ice hockey season.

Offseason

April 23: Eleven players were honored as WHEA Academic All-Stars.

Recruiting

.

Roster

2016–17 Huskies

Schedule

|-
!colspan=12 align="center"  style=""| Regular Season

|-
!colspan=12 align="center"  style=""| WHEA Tournament

Awards and honors

Sources

References

Connecticut
UConn Huskies women's ice hockey seasons
Conn
Connect
Connect